The Mississippi Queen was the second-largest paddle wheel driven river steamboat ever built, second only to the larger American Queen. The ship was the largest such steamboat when she was built in 1976 by the Delta Queen Steamboat Company at Jeffboat in Indiana and was a seven-deck recreation of a classic Mississippi riverboat. She was later owned by the Majestic America Line. The Mississippi Queen had 206 state rooms for a capacity of 412 guests and a crew of 157. It was 116 meters (382 ft) long, 21 meters (68 ft) wide, and displaced 3,709 metric tonnes (3,364 tons).

The Mississippi Queen was a genuine stern paddlewheeler with a wheel that measured 6.7 meters (22 ft) in diameter by 11 meters (36 ft) wide and weighed 77 metric tonnes (70 tons). The steamboat also featured a 44 whistle steam calliope, which was the largest on the Mississippi River system.

The Mississippi Queen was laid up in New Orleans at Perry Street Wharf after being gutted, initially for renovation. Instead, however, the steamboat was sold for scrap in May 2009. She was towed for the last time to Morgan City, Louisiana in March 2011 to be cut down.

In popular culture 
A steamboat called the Mississippi Queen was used in the 1982 episode "Cap'n Spanky's Showboat" in the animated television series The Little Rascals.

The song 'Evangeline' written by Robbie Robertson & performed by The Band and Emmylou Harris references the boat - "Evangeline, Evangeline, curses the soul of the Mississippi Queen"

The song “Mississippi Queen” released by the American rock band, Mountain, in 1972  makes reference to a dancer on the boat.

See also 
Delta Queen
American Queen

References

External links 
Mississippi Queen Tribute Site

Paddle steamers of the United States
Steamships
Passenger ships of the United States
Ships built in Indiana
1976 ships
Delta Queen Steamboat Company
Steamboats of the Mississippi River